H. microdon  may refer to:
 Haplochromis microdon, a fish species endemic to Tanzania
 Hyaenodon microdon, an extinct mammal species

See also
 Microdon